Jagielski (feminine: Jagielska, plural: Jagielscy) may refer to:

 Harry Jagielski (1931–1993), American football player
 Helmut Jagielski (1934–2002), German footballer
 Jake Jagielski, fictional character
 Jerzy Jagielski (1897–1955), Polish chess master and journalist
 Jim Jagielski (born 1961), American software engineer 
 Mieczysław Jagielski (1924–1997), Polish politician
 Wojciech Jagielski (born 1960), Polish journalist and author

See also 
 Jagielka

Polish-language surnames